Pet food is animal feed intended for consumption by pets. Typically sold in pet stores and supermarkets, it is usually specific to the type of animal, such as dog food or cat food. Most meat used for animals is a byproduct of the human food industry, and is not regarded as "human grade".

In 2019, the world pet food market was valued at US$87.08 billion and is projected to grow to US$113.2 billion by the year 2024. The pet food market is dominated by five major companies, as of 2020: Mars, Inc., Nestle Purina Petcare, J. M. Smucker, Hill's Pet Nutrition, Inc. (owned by Colgate-Palmolive), and Blue Buffalo Co. Ltd (owned by General Mills).

Industry

In the United States, pet-food sales in 2016 reached an all-time high of $28.23 billion. Mars is the leading company in the pet food industry, making about $17 billion annually in pet-care products. Online sales of pet food are increasing and contributing to this growth. Online sales in the US increased 15 percent in 2015.  Worldwide, the compound annual growth rate of pet food purchased online was more than 25% between 2013–2018. , the U.S. leads the world in pet-food spending.

Impact and sustainability 

Given the carnivorous diets fed to many pets (especially cats and dogs), involving the consumption of an estimated fifth of the world's meat and fish, the impact of pet-food production on climate change, other environmental impacts and land-use becomes an issue.

A 2023 review on the topic indicates adequate vegan diets, which are more sustainable, would not have adverse impacts on the health of pet dogs and cats. There also is research on insect-based pet food.

A life-cycle analysis of contemporary pet foods suggests wet foods for cats and dogs tend to have a larger impact than dry foods. It also suggests there are substantial opportunities for improvement in "all phases of the pet food life cycle, including formulation, ingredient selection, manufacturing processes" and so on.

Like humans, dogs are omnivores. As of 2018, there are around 470 million pet dogs and around 370 million pet cats according to Statista and as of 2022 the population of pets tends to increase.

Fish food

Fish foods normally contain macronutrients, trace elements and vitamins necessary to keep captive fish in good health. Approximately 80% of fishkeeping hobbyists feed their fish exclusively prepared foods that most commonly are produced in flake, pellet or tablet form. Pelleted forms, some of which sink rapidly, are often used for larger fish or bottom-feeding species such as loaches or catfish. Some fish foods also contain additives, such as beta carotene or sex hormones, to artificially enhance the color of ornamental fish.

Bird food

Bird foods are used both in birdfeeders and to feed pet birds. It typically consist of a variety of seeds. However, not all birds eat seeds. Nectar (essentially sugar water) attracts hummingbirds.

Cat food

Cats are obligate carnivores, though most commercial cat food contains both animal and plant material supplemented with vitamins, minerals and other nutrients. Cat food is formulated to address the specific nutritional requirements of cats, in particular containing the amino acid taurine, as cats cannot thrive on taurine-deficient food.
Optimal levels of taurine for cat food have been established by the Waltham Centre for Pet Nutrition.

Dog food

Recommendations differ on what diet is best for dogs. Some people argue dogs have thrived on leftovers and scraps from their human owners for thousands of years, and commercial dog foods (which have only been available for the past century) contain poor-quality meats, additives, and other ingredients dogs should not ingest, or that commercial dog food is not nutritionally sufficient for their dogs. Many commercial brands are formulated using insights gained from scientific nutritional studies.

Raw feeding

Raw feeding is the practice of feeding domestic dogs, cats and other animals a diet consisting primarily of uncooked meat, edible bones, and organs. The ingredients used to formulate raw diets can vary. Some pet owners choose to make home-made raw diets to feed their animals, but commercial raw food diets are also available. Veterinary associations such as the American Veterinary Medical Association, British Veterinary Association and Canadian Veterinary Medical Association have warned of the animal and public health risk that could arise from feeding raw meat to pets and have stated that there is no scientific evidence to support the claimed benefits of raw feeding.

The practice of feeding raw diets has raised some concerns due to the risk of food borne illnesses, zoonosis and nutritional imbalances. People who feed their dogs raw food do so for a multitude of reasons, including but not limited to: culture, beliefs surrounding health, nutrition and what is perceived to be more natural for their pets. Feeding raw food can be perceived by owners as allowing the pet to stay in touch with their wild, carnivorous ancestry. The raw food movement has occurred in parallel to the change in human food trends for more natural and organic products.

Feeding human foods to animals
Prepared foods and some raw ingredients may be toxic for animals, and care should be taken when feeding animals leftover food.  It is known that the following foods are potentially unsafe for cats, dogs and pigs:
 Chocolate, coffee-based products and soft drinks
 Raisins and grapes
 Macadamia nuts
 Garlic (in large doses) and onions
 Alcohol
Generally, cooked and marinated foods should be avoided, as well as sauces and gravies, which may contain ingredients that, although well tolerated by humans, may be toxic to animals. Xylitol, an alternative sweetener found in chewing gum and baked goods designed for diabetics, is highly toxic to cats, dogs, and ferrets.

Labeling and regulation

United States 
In the United States and its associated territories, all pet food is regulated by the Food and Drug Administration (FDA), the United States Department of Agriculture (USDA), and the Federal Trade Commission (FTC).  It is further regulated at the state level. State Department of Agriculture officials, major feed manufacturers, and ingredient suppliers form the Association of American Feed Control Officials (AAFCO), a non-government agency that establishes guidelines and standards on feed laws and regulations. Although government officials do comprise a large portion of AAFCO, it has no regulatory authority and acts simply as an advisory body, working closely with the FDA to develop standards that food consumed by animals must meet. AAFCO leaves the responsibility of regulating these standards to the individual states. Most states have adopted the guidelines set forth by AAFCO.

AAFCO requires that all pet food products sold in the United States have labels that contain eight components:

 Brand and Product Name: These rules address the use of ingredient names in the product name. How ingredients may be included in the product name depends on the percentage of that ingredient in the product, and the use of certain descriptors. For example, there are different rules for "Beef Dog Food", "Beef Recipe Dog Food", "Dog Food with Beef" and "Beef Flavor Dog Food".
 Name of Species for which the pet food is intended: This must be conspicuously designated in words on the principal display panel, but may be included in the product name, such as "Beef Dog Food" or "Salmon Treats for Cats".
 Quantity Statement: This is the net weight or net volume, and it must be expressed in the correct units and placed on the lower third of the principal display panel.
 Guaranteed Analysis: This lists the percentage of each of the nutrients in the food. The minimum percent of crude protein and crude fat, the maximum percent of crude fiber, and moisture are always required. Note that "crude" refers to the analysis method, rather than the quality of the nutrient.
 Ingredient Statement: Ingredients must be listed in order of predominance by weight, on an "as formulated basis". The ingredient that makes up the highest percentage of the total weight as it goes into the product is listed first.
 Nutritional Adequacy Statement: This is a statement that indicates the food is complete and balanced for a particular life stage, such as growth, reproduction, adult maintenance or a combination of these, or intended for intermittent or supplemental feeding only. AAFCO makes rules for nutrient levels required for such a statement. Products conspicuously identified on the principal display panel as a snack, treat, or supplement are exempt. 
 Feeding Directions: All pet foods labeled as complete and balanced for any or all life stages must include feeding directions that, at a minimum, state "Feed (amount of product) per (weight) of dog/cat". Feeding frequency must also be stated. Feeding directions are optional for treats, as long as they are labeled as snacks or treats.
 Name and address of manufacturer or distributor: This names the pet food company as guarantor of the product and gives the company's location. If the company uses a separate manufacturer for actual production or distribution, the label must show that relationship by using the words "Manufactured for" or "Distributed by".

Dog and cat foods labeled as "complete and balanced" must meet standards established by the AAFCO either by meeting a nutrient profile or by passing a feeding trial. Cat and dog food nutrient profiles were established by the AAFCO's Feline Nutrition Expert Subcommittee (1991–1992) and the Canine Nutrition Expert Subcommittee (1990–1991), respectively. The nutrient profiles were updated in 2016.

The "Family Rule" allows a manufacturer to have a product that is "nutritionally similar" to another product in the same "family" to adopt the latter's "complete and balanced" statement without itself undergoing any feeding tests. The "similar" food must be of the same processing type; contain the same moisture content; bear a statement of nutritional adequacy for the same or less demanding life stage as the lead product; contain a dry matter, metabolizable energy (ME) content within 7.5% of the lead product's dry matter; meet the same levels of crude protein, calcium, phosphorus, zinc, lysine, thiamine (and for cat foods, potassium and taurine) as the lead food; and meet or exceed the nutrient levels and ratios of the lead family product or the AAFCO nutrient profiles, whichever is lower. The label statement on the similar food can be the same as the lead product if the ME is substantiated by the 10-day ME feeding study.

Critics of the AAFCO standards argue that such requirements are too lax. Generational studies conducted by researchers at University of California, Davis have shown some foods that pass AAFCO's feeding trials are still not suitable for long-term use and estimated that of 100 foods that pass the nutritional analysis, 10 to 20 would not pass the feeding trials. Although maximum levels of intake of some nutrients have been established because of concerns with overnutrition, many still lack a maximum allowed level and some contains large disparity between maximum and minimum values. The NRC accepts that despite ongoing research, large gaps still exist in the knowledge of quantitative nutritional information for specific nutrients. Some professionals acknowledge the possibilities of phytochemicals and other vital nutrients that have yet to be recognized as essential by nutritional science. With such broad guidelines and loose feeding trial standards, critics argue that the term "complete and balanced" is inaccurate and even deceptive.  An AAFCO panel expert has stated that "although the AAFCO profiles are better than nothing, they provide false securities."

Certain manufacturers label their products with terms such as premium, ultra premium, and holistic. Such terms currently have no official definitions. The AAFCO is currently considering defining some of the terms. However, the terms "natural" and "organic" do have definitions; e.g., organic products must meet the same USDA regulations as for organic human food.

Canada 
In Canada, products that pass the Canadian Veterinary Medical Association (CVMA) Pet Food Certification Program, which involves a feeding trial, carry a CVMA label on their packaging. Participation in the program is voluntary.  The program was discontinued at the end of 2007. There is no government regulation of pet food manufactured in Canada. However, imported pet food does receive stringent oversight.

European Union 
In the European Union, pet food is regulated by the same harmonised standards across the EU, via the Feeding Stuffs Act.

All ingredients used for pet food have to be fit for human consumption according to EU requirements. But regulations require that pet food that contains by-products be labelled as "Not for human consumption" even though such by-products have to be derived from animals declared fit for human consumption. Raw pet food has to be labelled "Pet food only".

Products meant for daily feeding are labelled "complete feedingstuff" or "complete petfood" or other EU languages equivalent. Products meant for intermittent feeding are labeled "complementary feedingstuff or "complementary pet food" while products with an ash content of over 40% are labeled "mineral feedingstuff". Ingredients are listed in descending order by weight.

With the released Commission Regulation (EU) No 107/2013, the European Union has set new maximum levels for melamine in canned pet food. According to results of an in-depth research of the 2007 pet food crisis, melamine used in coatings for pet food cans can migrate into the food. Therefore, the regular melamine migration limit (SML) of 2.5 mg/kg for food and feed has been expanded to pet food. This limit is valid for canned wet pet food on an ‘as sold’ basis.

The European Union does not use a unified nutrient requirement. A manufacturer committee called FEDIAF (European Pet Food Industry Federation) makes recommendations for cats and dogs that members follow.

2007 recalls

Beginning in March 2007, there were massive recalls of many brands of cat and dog foods. The recalls came in response to reports of kidney failure in pets consuming mostly wet pet foods made with wheat gluten from a single Chinese company, beginning in February 2007.  After more than three weeks of complaints from consumers, the recall began voluntarily with the Canadian company Menu Foods on March 16, 2007, when a company test showed sickness and death in some of the test animals.  Soon after, there were numerous media reports of animal deaths as a result of kidney failure, and several other companies who received the contaminated wheat gluten also voluntarily recalled dozens of pet food brands. Menu Foods recalled almost over 50 brands of dog food, and over 40 brands of cat food. Nestlé Purina PetCare withdrew all sizes and varieties of Alpo "Prime Cuts in Gravy". Some companies were not affected and utilized the situation to generate sales for alternative pet foods.

2021 recalls 
In early January 2021, Midwestern Pet Food products recalled its Sportmix products which were linked to the death of over 70 dogs and sickness in about 80 others. Dog and cat food, sold by retailers across the United States over the internet, were being investigated by the US Food and Drug Administration for the possibility that fatal levels of aflatoxins were present in the food. Midwestern, which is based in Evansville, Indiana, broadened its recall to include all its pet food products manufactured in its Oklahoma facility that contain corn and have expiration dates on or before July 9, 2022.

See also 
 Food safety

References

 

de:Futtermittel 
pt:Ração animal